Kampong Seila is a khum (commune) of Kampong Seila District in Sihanoukville Province, Cambodia.

Villages

Cham Srei
Krang At
Thmei
Veal

References

Communes of Sihanoukville Province